The Girl He Didn't Buy is a 1928 American silent comedy drama film directed by Dallas M. Fitzgerald and starring Pauline Garon, Allan Simpson and Rosemary Cooper. It is also known by the alternative title of A Broadway Bride.

Synopsis
An aspiring Broadway performer gets engaged to her show's financial backer, but is really in love with another man.

Cast
 Pauline Garon as Ruth Montaigne  
 Allan Simpson as Edwin Edinburg  
 Rosemary Cooper as Maizie Dupont  
 Gladden James as Hal De Forrest  
 William Eugene as Philip D'Arcy  
 Jimmy Aubrey as Hans  
 Mae Prestell as Martha

References

Bibliography
 Munden, Kenneth. The American Film Institute Catalog of Motion Pictures Produced in the United States, Part 1. University of California Press, 1997.

External links

1928 films
1928 comedy-drama films
Films directed by Dallas M. Fitzgerald
American silent feature films
American black-and-white films
1920s English-language films
1920s American films
Silent American comedy-drama films